The Devonshire Dome building (previously known as the Devonshire Royal Hospital) is a Grade II* listed 18th-century former stable block in Buxton, Derbyshire. It is now the site of the Buxton Campus of the University of Derby.

History

1780–1850s: Stables
Built between 1780 and 1789, the original building was designed by John Carr of York for William Cavendish, 5th Duke of Devonshire. Octagonal in shape, it housed up to 120 horses and the servants of the guests of the Crescent Hotel, built in combination as part of the plan to promote Buxton as a spa town. The interior façade was described as an almost exact copy of The Palace of Christian Kings at the Alhambra in Granada.

1859–2000: Hospital
In 1859, the Buxton Bath Charity had persuaded the Duke of Devonshire to allow part of the building – by then accommodating nothing like the 110 horses for which it was designed – to be converted to a charity hospital for the use of the ‘sick poor’ coming in for treatment from the ‘Cottonopolis’ of Lancashire and Yorkshire. The Devonshire estate architect, Henry Currey, architect for St Thomas’s Hospital in London, converted two thirds of the building into a hospital.

In 1881, the Buxton Bath Charity trustees, under their chairman Dr William Henry Robertson, persuaded William Cavendish, 7th Duke of Devonshire to give them the use of the whole building in exchange for providing new stables elsewhere in the town. Local architect Robert Rippon Duke was commissioned to design a 300-bed hospital to rival Bath and Harrogate for charity medical provision. The Cotton Districts Convalescent fund put up £25,000 for the conversion.  The steel structure was clad in slate, and proposed to be supported by 22 curved steel arms. However, during construction the Tay Bridge disaster occurred on 28 December 1879, and so the number of arms was revised upwards.

Overtaken by the West Baden Springs Hotel designed by Harrison Albright in 1902, the record is now routinely surpassed today by space frame domes, such as the Georgia Dome, but the Devonshire is still the largest unsupported dome in the UK.

Further changes were undertaken, with the clock tower (a tribute to the hospital's chairman Dr William Henry Robertson) and lodge completed in 1882, surgical wards in 1897, spa baths in 1913, and the dining room and kitchens in 1921. The building became known as the Devonshire Royal Hospital in 1934. It was the last of the eight hydropathic hospitals in England to close, in 2000.

2001–present: University and  college campus, venue and attraction
On 31 January 2001, the University of Derby acquired the Devonshire Dome and associated surrounding buildings. The university received £4.7m from the Heritage Lottery Fund for the restoration and redevelopment project.

Refurbished and reopened in 2003, the main building and its surrounding Victorian era villas are now part of the University of Derby. The Devonshire Dome functioned as a campus of the University of Derby and of Buxton & Leek College, and as a commercial venue and visitor attraction.

As a university campus, it has been the base for the University of Derby’s degree programmes in Outdoor Leadership and Adventure Sports Coaching, Events Management, Hospitality Management, Tourism Management, Professional Culinary Arts and Spa & Wellness Management. In October 2019, the university announced that the dome would cease to be a campus for university courses from 2022, when the Outdoors, Adventure, Spa and Wellness courses will close and the rest of Centre for Contemporary Hospitality and Tourism courses will move to the university's main campus in Derby. The dome continues to be an education campus for Buxton & Leek College.

As a commercial venue, it is frequently used for large weddings, and has hosted celebrity weddings, including that of Hollyoaks star Kieron Richardson. Open to the public, the space houses cafés, a restaurant and study spaces, and visitors can observe the swing of a Foucault pendulum during certain times of the year.

On 23 October 2015, the venue played host to Jack Massey's defeat of Gogita Gorgiladze for the vacant WBC Youth Silver Title.

References

External links
Devonshire Dome (commercial) website
University of Derby website
Buxton & Leek College website
Newsreel showing soldiers undergoing treatment in 1916

Dome
Devonshire Dome
University of Derby
Grade II* listed buildings in Derbyshire
Devonshire Dome